The following is an alphabetical list of Amharic writers, presenting an overview of notable authors, journalists, novelists, playwrights, poets and screenwriters who have released literary works  in the Amharic language, used predominantly in Ethiopia.

List

See also 

 List of Ethiopian writers

References 

Amharic language
Ethiopian literature
Amharic